In computer science and graph theory, the maximum weight matching problem is the problem of finding, in a weighted graph, a matching in which the sum of weights is maximized.

A special case of it is the assignment problem, in which the input is restricted to be a bipartite graph, and the matching constrained to be have cardinality that of the smaller of the two partitions. Another special case is the problem of finding a maximum cardinality matching on an unweighted graph: this corresponds to the case where all edge weights are the same.

Algorithms 
There is a  time algorithm to find a maximum matching or a maximum weight matching in a graph that is not bipartite; it is due to Jack Edmonds, is called the paths, trees, and flowers method or simply Edmonds' algorithm, and uses bidirected edges. A generalization of the same technique can also be used to find maximum independent sets in claw-free graphs.

More elaborate algorithms exist and are reviewed by Duan and Pettie (see Table III). Their work proposes an approximation algorithm for the maximum weight matching problem, which runs in linear time for any fixed error bound.

References 

Combinatorial optimization
Computational problems in graph theory